Amelia Piccinini (20 January 1917 – 3 April 1979) was an Italian athlete and before footballer.

She won two medals, at senior level, at the International athletics competitions.

Career
She competed for Italy at the 1948 Summer Olympics held in London, England,  where she won the silver medal in the Women's Shot Put event.

In 1946 at the European Championships she won the bronze medal in the shot put and finished four in the long jump.

Achievements

National titles
Amelia Piccinini has won 20 times consecutively the individual national championship.
4 wins in the long jump (1939, 1940, 1943, 1946)
12 wins in the shot put (1941, 1942, 1943, 1946, 1947, 1948, 1949, 1950, 1951, 1952, 1953, 1954)
4 wins in the pentathlon (1937, 1946, 1947, 1948)

See also
 Italian Athletics Championships - Multi winners

References

External links
 
 

1917 births
1979 deaths
Italian female pentathletes
Italian female long jumpers
Italian female shot putters
Italian women's footballers
Olympic athletes of Italy
Athletes (track and field) at the 1948 Summer Olympics
Olympic silver medalists for Italy
Sportspeople from Turin
European Athletics Championships medalists
Medalists at the 1948 Summer Olympics
Olympic silver medalists in athletics (track and field)
Italian Athletics Championships winners
20th-century Italian women
Women's association footballers not categorized by position